Del Valle High is a public high school located on the southeast side of El Paso, Texas. DV, as it is commonly called, is part of the Ysleta Independent School District, serving 2,000 students in grades 9 to 12. At the start of the 2022 academic year, Ivan Cedillo was appointed principal of Del Valle High School. The TEA association classifies Del Valle as a "recognized school" as of 2011.

In 2013, The Texas UIL changed the area schools from 4A to 5A and 5A to 6A division. As of 2014, Del Valle High School is in the UIL 2-5A division. Del Valle has had much success with its athletic programs. The Boys Varsity Soccer team have won two Texas State Championships led by Coach Bruce A. Reichman. Other sports such as Baseball & Softball are regularly in the playoffs. DV's Football program is regarded as an El Paso powerhouse in the 2-4A (Now 2-5A) UIL District that has had great success being District, Bi-District Champions that continue on in the Texas playoffs. From the late 90's the Varsity Football program has had successful seasons under Head Coaches: Chuck Veliz, Jesse Perales and now currently under Rudy Contreras. Track & Field Coach Valerie Salazar-Hairston was honored by The El Paso Times as the Girls All City Track and Field Coach of the Year (Sept 2010). Coach Salazar-Hairston led the Conquistadores to their first District Championship and swept the District with all three teams (Freshman, JV and Varsity).

Del Valle also has an award-winning marching Band that has made it to the UIL Texas State Marching Contest 3 times: 2003, 2005, and most recently 2009. The Band is also considered one of El Paso's strong powerhouse. The program has been successful in the NMSU Tournament of Bands, in Las Cruces, NM. The program has also attended the BOA Regionals and Super Regionals in El Paso and San Antonio, Texas.

The campus opened in August 1987 and recently celebrated its thirty year anniversary in 2017. DV's first graduating class was in June 1990. The School is located very close to the US/Mexican border, making the population of Del Valle mostly Hispanic.

During 2006-2008, Del Valle High School had new additions built on to its existing campus which included: New Roofing, new Tennis Courts, a new Track around the football field, a three-story state of the art science wing, a band and musical arts wing and a modern field house to accommodate the growing, successful athletics programs. Jumbotron was added to the football field in 2018. Del Valle's campus is very well maintained and renovations are common.

DVHS also offers Multinational/Multimedia Business Magnet School within its campus. This program offers informative information for students that want to pursue a career with business and marketing. Some topics covered in this group are entrepreneurship, finance, marketing and business information tech.

Notable alumni
Steven Montez, Professional Football Player
M.O.C, 2020 Graduate. Game Announcer for the Del Valle Conquistadores, M.O.C has announced sports such as Volleyball, Basketball, Soccer, Softball, and baseball.

Clubs, groups and sports
Astronomy Club
AVID
Band
Baseball
Basketball
Cheerleading
Choir
Conquest Journal (Video/Audio Production)
Conquerettes
Cross Country
Dance
DECA
Drama Club
Debate Team
Dual Language
Future Business Leaders of America (FBLA)
Family, Career and Community Leaders of America (FCCLA)
Football
French National Honor Society (FNHS)
Fuego Dance
Golf
Guitar Club
Law Enforcement Club
Fire Tech
Multinational Business Academy (Magnet)
Math Team
National Art Honor Society (NAHS)
National English Honor Society (NEHS)
National Technical Honor Society (NTHS)
National Honor Society
Newspaper (The Expedition)
Orchestra
Piano
JROTC
Soccer
Softball
Spanish National Honor Society (SNHS)
Student Council
Swimming
Tennis
Theater Club
Track & Field
Valor
Volleyball
Wrestling

Feeder schools
Del Valle Middle (Former Valley View Middle)
Mission Valley Elementary
Lancaster Elementary
Del Valle Elementary
Presa Elementary
Alicia Chacon International

References 

Educational institutions in the United States with year of establishment missing
High schools in El Paso, Texas
Ysleta Independent School District high schools
Magnet schools in Texas